Mercantile Center (originally Mechanics National Bank Tower) is a high-rise building located at 100 Front Street in Downtown Worcester, Massachusetts. The former Worcester Center complex, comprising 100 Front Street and the adjacent nine story tower at 120 Front Street were named Mercantile Center by its owner, Franklin Realty Advisors, in early 2016. 

It was completed in 1971, as a part of the  Worcester Center urban renewal project, and has  of interior space. The building's footprint is not square, but rectangular, with the short sides being 5 windows across, and the long sides being 7 windows across. The short sides still feature the Mechanics Bank "M" at the top of the façade above the top floor.

Photo gallery

References

External links
 Emporis Page on building

Skyscrapers in Worcester, Massachusetts
Skyscraper office buildings in Massachusetts

Welton Becket buildings
Office buildings completed in 1971